The 2015 Medway Council election took place on 7 May 2015, alongside the 2015 UK General Election. The elections were to elect all 55 seats across 22 wards. The Conservatives held the council, with 36 seats (a majority of 16). The Labour Party has 15 seats, and UKIP has 4.

Following the announcement of the results, the Trade Unionist and Socialist Coalition called for a re-count in Rainham North ward after their candidate received no votes, despite claiming that he had voted for himself; however, the council's returning officer confirmed that the result was correct and no further action could be taken.

Results

A total of 1,735 ballot papers were rejected.

Council Composition

Prior to the election, the composition of the council was:

After the election, to composition of the council was:

I - Independent

Ward Results
An asterisk denotes an incumbent councillor seeking re-election.

Chatham Central

Cuxton and Halling

Gillingham North

Cllrs Cooper and Stamp both were previously elected as Independent councillors in 2011.

Gillingham South

Hempstead and Wigmore

Lordswood and Capstone

Luton and Wayfield

Peninsula

Sands previously stood as a candidate for the English Democrats in 2011.

Princes Park

Rainham Central

Rainham North

Hewett was previously elected in 2011 as a Conservative councillor.

Rainham South

River

Rochester East

Rochester South and Horsted

Rochester West

Strood North

Strood Rural

Strood South

Twydall

Walderslade

Watling

References

2015 English local elections
May 2015 events in the United Kingdom
2015
2010s in Kent